Chrystal Bougon is the owner of Curvy Girl Lingerie; a plus-size lingerie store  and the CEO BlissConnection.com. She is the author of the book "The Curvy Girl Playbook". She is the executive producer of the television show Plus Life.
She is also the host of the radio show “Everyone Wants to Have Better Sex”.

Career
Chrystal Bougon runs the only plus size lingerie boutique in the U.S. called Curvy Girl Lingerie. The store was vandalized three times in 2015.

Bougon also started BlissConnection, which is a woman-owned romance store that sells toys, lubricants, oils and costumes. BlissConnection also offers information related to sex products for enhancing intimate relationships.

She has written an essay in the Jes Baker's book "Things No One Will Tell Fat Girls" titled "Hot Sex & The Curvy Girl".

She is the host of the radio show titled "Bliss Talks".

She is the author of several books including "The Curvy Girl Playbook".

She and Adryenn Ashley are the executive producer of the reality TV show Plus Life. The show is about her boutique Curvy Girl boutique.

She regularly writes articles and columns for Huffington Post and YourTango.

Before starting her own ventures she used to work for technology companies in Silicon Valley.

Regular Women-Unphotoshopped Campaign
Bougon started the campaign by asking  women of all shapes and sizes to post pictures of themselves in lingerie on her Curvy Girl Facebook Page. Bougon says she wanted to connect with the “regular” people out there in the Internet world and show them that, "For most Curvies, they have rolls, bumps, lumps, scars, stretch marks, surgery scars, breasts that are natural and that have breast fed babies. And they can still be stunning and beautiful."  After fitness advocate Maria Kang criticized the campaign in a post on Kang's Facebook page, Bougon and other people reported Kang's comments as "hate speech" to Facebook's administration, which blocked Kang's accounts for two days.  Kang and Bougon subsequently debated their opposing views over social and broadcast media. Bougon made numerous appearances in shows like CNN, the Today Show, Good Morning America, and The Bethany Show to defend her campaign.

Fat shaming, BMI and alienation: COVID-19 brought new stigma to large-sized people 
Chrystal Bougon cried after the needle went into her arm. Not because her first dose of the Moderna vaccine hurt. But because, finally, being fat actually paid off.

The 53-year-old was inoculated in the parking lot of Kaiser Permanente in San José on a rainy Friday in March, four days after eligibility in California was broadened to include people with underlying conditions. Among them, a body mass index of 40 or more — 233 pounds for an adult who is 5 feet 4 inches tall. The virus has underscored yet another serious inequity. Studies link higher body mass index, or BMI, with increased risk for severe COVID-19.

In 2013, the American Medical Assn. recognized obesity as a disease. The fat acceptance movement argues it is possible to be healthy at any size.

Fat Product Reviews - YouTube 
Chrystal Bougon is running a YouTube channel by the name FatProductReview in which Fat Products are Reviewed by Fat People For Fat People.

Awards
As a radio show host she got the "Top Talker" and "Frontier Fifty" award from the Talker magazine with Dr. Laura Schlessinger, Rush Limbaugh and Sean Hannity in the same year.

References

External links

Curvy Girl

Fat acceptance activists
American television producers
Living people
Year of birth missing (living people)
Place of birth missing (living people)
21st-century American women